Roseville Transit is the operator of mass transportation in the expansive Sacramento, California suburb of Roseville. Fourteen local routes provide intracity service six days per week. Commuter service is also provided eight times per weekday, connecting the city with Downtown Sacramento.

Route list

See also
 Placer County Transit
 Sacramento Regional Transit District

External links
Website

Bus transportation in California
Transportation in Sacramento, California
Roseville, California